Mountain Press Publishing Company is an American book publishing company based in Missoula, Montana.  It specializes in western U.S. history, natural history, and non-technical earth science, geology, and ecology.  

The company began in 1948 when David P. Flaccus started an offset printing business in Missoula.  Over several years the company evolved into an independent publishing company and eventually a distributor for other publishers.  The company's largest and most popular series of books is Roadside Geology with 29 titles and sales of over 1 million total copies.  Other popular series include Geology Underfoot (7 titles) and Roadside History (18 titles).

External links 
 Mountain Press Publishing Company

Book publishing companies of the United States
Publishing companies established in 1948
Companies based in Montana
American companies established in 1948
1948 establishments in Montana